Samuel Christianson Simanjuntak (born ) is an Indonesian professional footballer who plays as a left back for Liga 1 club PSM Makassar.

Early career 
Samuel started his football career from the Jakarta Football Academy Football School (JFAS). When he was 12 years old, Samuel was selected as the player who was given the opportunity to undergoing joint training with one of EPL clubs, Southampton F.C. in 2012. Samuel joined the Royal European Football Academy (REFA), Valencia, at 16 years old and he call up Indonesia national under-19 football team at 2017.

Club career

Sriwijaya FC
On 4 December 2017, Christianson signed a one-year contract with Indonesian Liga 1 club Sriwijaya on a free transfer. Christianson made his Sriwijaya debut in a 3–0 loss against Mitra Kukar on 18 July 2018 as a substitute for Yogi Rahadian in the 69th minute.

PSS Sleman
On 28 August 2019, Christianson moved to Sleman and signed a one-year contract with Indonesian Liga 1 club PSS Sleman on a free transfer. Christianson made his league debut in a 4–0 loss against Arema on 24 September 2019.

Madura United
On 4 January 2020, Christianson moved to Pamekasan and signed a one-year contract with Indonesian Liga 1 club Madura United on a free transfer. He signed for Madura United alongside Brian Ferreira and Haris Tuharea. This season was suspended on 27 March 2020 due to the COVID-19 pandemic. The season was abandoned and was declared void on 20 January 2021. And finally Christianson made his league debut on 3 September 2021 in a match against Persikabo 1973.

Persija Jakarta
In January 2022, Christianson signed a contract with Liga 1 club Persija Jakarta on loan from Madura United. He made his league debut in a 2–1 loss against Persipura Jayapura on 11 January 2022 as a substitute for Novri Setiawan in the 82nd minute at the Kapten I Wayan Dipta Stadium, Gianyar.

PSM Makassar
Christianson was signed for PSM Makassar to play in Liga 1 in the 2022–23 season. He made his league debut on 10 September 2022 in a match against Persebaya Surabaya at the Gelora B.J. Habibie Stadium, Parepare.

Career statistics

Club

Honours

International 
Indonesia U-16
 AFF U-16 Youth Championship runner-up: 2013
Indonesia U-19
 AFF U-19 Youth Championship third place: 2017, 2018
Indonesia U-22
 AFF U-22 Youth Championship: 2019

References

External links
 Samuel Christianson at Soccerway
 Samuel Christianson at Liga Indonesia

Indonesian footballers
1999 births
Batak people
Living people
People from Depok
Sportspeople from West Java
Liga 1 (Indonesia) players
Sriwijaya F.C. players
PSS Sleman players
Madura United F.C. players
Persija Jakarta players
PSM Makassar players
Indonesia youth international footballers
Association football defenders